Goodnight, Beantown is an American sitcom that aired on CBS for two brief seasons in 1983 and 1984.

Synopsis

The series stars Bill Bixby as Matt Cassidy and Mariette Hartley as Jennifer Barnes, two news anchors at WYN-TV, a fictional television station in Boston, Massachusetts. Matt is the station's evening news anchor and a longtime fixture at the station. However, when Matt's ratings begin to slide, the station management pairs the reluctant anchor with female co-anchor Jennifer.

The series follows their rocky relationship as they are not only coworkers but neighbors in the same building. Although slightly antagonistic at work, they are attracted to each other.

The series title comes from Matt's signoff at the end of the nightly newscasts, as "Beantown" is a common nickname for Boston (despite locals' disdain for the appellation).

Co-stars included Tracey Gold as the divorced Jennifer's daughter Susan and George Coe as station manager Dick Novak.  Over the two seasons, Charles Levin, G. W. Bailey, Jim Staahl, Stephanie Faracy and Todd Susman played their co-workers at WYN.

Bixby and Hartley had previously worked together on an episode of The Incredible Hulk, and at the time of making Goodnight, Beantown, Hartley was appearing in a series of television commercials for Polaroid cameras with James Garner.

The series first aired Sundays at 8:00 p.m. in the spring of 1983 for a limited run of five episodes. When it returned in the fall, it aired Sundays at 9:30 p.m. for 13 more episodes before being canceled because of its middling ratings.

Cast
 Bill Bixby as Matt Cassidy
 Mariette Hartley as Jennifer Barnes
 George Coe as Dick Novak
 Tracey Gold as Susan Barnes
 G. W. Bailey as Albert Addelson
 Stephanie Faracy as Valerie Wood
 Charles Levin as Sam Holliday
 Jim Staahl as Frank Fletcher
 Todd Susman as Augie Kleindab

US television ratings

Episode guide

Season 1 (1983)

Season 2 (1983–84)

Awards and nominations

References

External links

Fan site

1983 American television series debuts
1984 American television series endings
1980s American sitcoms
CBS original programming
Television series by Warner Bros. Television Studios
Television news sitcoms
English-language television shows
Television series about television
Television shows set in Boston